Arnold "Winky" Winkenhofer (August 30, 1905 – September 14, 1989) was an American football player and coach. He served as the head football coach at Western Kentucky State Teachers College in Bowling Green, Kentucky in 1942, compiling a record of 3–4–1, before the sport was halted at the school due to World War II. Winkenhofer was a four-time letter winner in football at Western Kentucky, from 1925 to 1928.

Winkenhofer was born on August 30, 1905, in Huntingburg, Indiana.  He moved to Atlanta in 1941 and worked there for the American Red Cross until his retirement in 1970. Winkenhofer was also a pioneer in water safety. He died on September 14, 1989, at Smyrna Hospital in Smyrna, Georgia, after having suffered from Alzheimer's disease.

Head coaching record

References

External links
 

1905 births
1989 deaths
American Red Cross personnel
Western Kentucky Hilltoppers football coaches
Western Kentucky Hilltoppers football players
People from Huntingburg, Indiana
Neurological disease deaths in Georgia (U.S. state)
Deaths from Alzheimer's disease